Polystoechotes punctata is a species of giant lacewing in the family Ithonidae. Found in Central America and North America, this giant lacewing was considered extirpated from eastern North America by the 1950s but was serendipitously rediscovered in Fayetteville, Arkansas, where it was found clinging to a facade at a Walmart in 2012.

References

Further reading

 

Ithonidae
Articles created by Qbugbot
Insects described in 1793